Carmélia Alves (14 February 1923 – 3 November 2012), a Brazilian singer known as the "Queen of Baião", was one of the country's best-known performers of baião, a folk rhythm popular in Northeast Brazil.

Alves began her career at the Hotel Copacabana in Rio de Janeiro, where she performed covers of hits by Carmen Miranda. Her friend, baião and accordionist Luiz Gonzaga, exposed her to the music of Northeast Brazil and inspired her to devote the rest of her career to baião.

Alves was married for 50 years to singer Jimmy Lester, who died in 1998. They had no children. They performed together throughout the world, including Argentina, Germany and Mexico. Their success in Argentina prompted Alves to open a branch of her recording company in Buenos Aires. In 2000, she formed a group of professional singers from the 1950s.

Death
Alves died from cancer and Alzheimer's disease at the Jacarepagua Hospital in Rio de Janeiro on 3 November 2012, at the age of 89.

References

1923 births
2012 deaths
20th-century Brazilian women singers
20th-century Brazilian singers
Musicians from Rio de Janeiro (city)
Deaths from cancer in Rio de Janeiro (state)